Paramelania is a genus of tropical freshwater snails with an operculum, aquatic gastropod mollusks in the family Paludomidae.

Distribution 
Species of the genus Paramelania live in Lake Tanganyika, Africa.

Species
There are two described species within the genus Paramelania and there may be more:
 Paramelania damoni (Smith, 1881) - type species, it is a species or an aggregate species
 Paramelania iridescens (Moore, 1898)

Description 
The type description of the genus Paramelania by Edgar Albert Smith (1881) reads as follows:

References
This article incorporates public domain text from the references

Paludomidae
Taxa named by Edgar Albert Smith
Gastropod genera
Taxonomy articles created by Polbot
Snails of Lake Tanganyika